On the road from Yelvala of Mysore to K R Nagara at about 25 km away we find a village called Dodde Koppalu. Left side of this road falls to Hunsur taluk and the right side belongs to K R Nagara taluk. Take a right turn at this village and go ahead. After a hamlet and a grove you are able to see twin towers of a church at a distance. That is the famous Doranahalli (Dornahalli) Church located 3 km away.

Doranahalli (Dornahalli), known locally as Christian Koppalu since it is dwelt by Christians only. As you walk along the road leading to the Church, on your left side before approaching the rivulet branched out of Cauvery, you can see a cluster of trees on an elevated land. This place was the erstwhile Doranahalli. After the turbulent strike of big famine and plague in the last century this village was abandoned and a new planned village was built at a new site by the efforts of Christian priests.

Doranahalli is famous for the miracle man St. Anthony. The story of Doranahalli goes back to some 200 years. That day it is said, a peasant of Doranahalli was ploughing his fields with a pair of bullocks. To a surprise, something struck the plough and the farmer stopped his work to look at it.  It was a human faced wooden doll. The farmer took it in his hands and closely examined it.  To his surprise it was not eaten away by the termites being in the mud for several years. The farmer thought it a wonder.  He kept it aside thinking that it could be a toy for his kids and continued his ploughing task.  The doll went with him to his home in the evening and suffered torture at the hands of his innocent kids.

On that night the farmer was in his dreams and to a surprise the wooden doll appeared to him like a sage. The sage in sanyasi robes told him not to dishonour the doll and promised him all good he wished. But next morning the farmer ignored it and carried on with his normal works. Later in the due course of time he lost his oxen, his intimates died and children fell ill. He was shaken now and began to recollect the events preceding these calamities.  He then thought of the dream and realised that there he erred.  He repented and built a small temple in his field at the spot where he found the doll and began worshipping it. Thus all his ailments were healed and he prospered.

Several years later he met a Christian priest at Mysore who was wearing the dress resembling the doll, narrated him about the doll. The priest accompanied him to his village and closely watched the small 13 inches wooden doll, which didn't have hands. He, at once, recognised it as the statue of St. Anthony with its revealing characteristics.  He then beatified the temple, made it a church.

It is recorded in the history that the Franciscan missionaries were on the missionary work around south India during the period of Vijayanagara Empire. But the Jesuits entered the Mysore province only after 1648 AD. These Jesuits were fond of Francis Xavier and Ignatius Loyola. Definitely they wouldn't have planted Anthony cult. Later after the end of Tippu Sultan in 1799, somewhere around 1803 AD Abbe du Bois entered Mysore province under the banner of Paris Foreign Mission (MEP). So we can surely conclude that the statue found at Doranahalli is the one belonging to the Franciscan missionaries and its date can be pointed to 14th to 16th century AD.

St. Anthony’s church – Doranahalli 

‘Doranahalli’ is a village where the famous St. Anthony’s Shrine is located with all majesty.  After the first church built by the farmer, another Church was built in the middle of 19th century but in the later days it became the presbytery. One other Church was built in 1920 by a generous man called T. Dharmaraj Chetty (second son of Sir T. R. A. Thumboo Chetty). Recently when it developed cracks it was demolished and rebuilt by retaining the original facade.

The structure behind this is the present church. Consecrated on 13 June 1969 this church in the shape of a Tau (English alphabet T) cross and with an ample space, can accommodate a thousand people.  At the front nave, above the corridor there is a big Cross and adjoining this is a pair of tall towers having cross at their tips. The construction of this memorable edifice was commenced in 1964 by Mon Signor I.H.LOBO and completed by Rev. R. FELIX THAVRO. This church also houses a small piece of St. Anthony's relic brought from Rome.

It was in 1977 one Mr. Chandappa Shetty of Mangalore built a structure on the place where the farmer had built a temple earlier. The main church offers special prayer services on Tuesdays and annual feast is celebrated on 13 June of every year.

St. Anthony’s Festival 

People from all angles gather here in Doranahalli on 13 June every year to attend the Holy Mass and fulfill their vows.  They are not only from Karnataka but also from Goa, Kerala and Tamil Nadu. That day Doranahalli and neighbouring villages are filled with these pilgrims and there will be an atmosphere of grand fair. Giant wheel, Tora-tora, Magic shows, Hotels, Games, Toys, Bangles, Eatables are the added attractions. People offer candles, flowers, silver replicas of human organs as a gratitude for the favours bestowed on them by God through St. Anthony.  They also go for tonsuring of hair, distributing food to the poor as grateful gestures to the graces received. Scenes of collecting the soil of the Shrine are also seen.

In the evening there will be a colourful car procession of St. Anthony.  People in the procession sing the glory of God, praise the Saint and perform Holy Rosary prayer. Some even splash crystal salt and puffed rice along with flower petals on the car.

Villages in Mysore district